Grodowiec  is a village in the administrative district of Gmina Grębocice, within Polkowice County, Lower Silesian Voivodeship, in south-western Poland.

The village has a population of 150.

References

External links 
 Virtual Visit

Grodowiec